West Virginia Route 127 is an east–west state highway located in northeast West Virginia. The western terminus is at West Virginia Route 29 near Forks of Cacapon in Hampshire County. The eastern terminus is at the Virginia state line west of U.S. Route 522 and east of Good, where WV 127 continues eastward as State Route 127.

WV 127 is part of the Bloomery Pike, which also encompasses part of WV 29 and SR 127.

Route description

From its western terminus with WV 29 near Forks of Cacapon, WV 127 crosses over the North River. Gaston Road (CR 45/7) serves as a cut-off road between WV 29 and WV 127, and its one-lane arched bridge crosses the North River shortly before its confluence with the Cacapon. WV 127 continues east over the Cacapon River then follows Bloomery Run through Bloomery Gap. The old Bloomery Iron Furnace stands along Bloomery Run with a roadside park on WV 127 located there. From the bloomery furnace, WV 127 curves southeastward through the historic community of Bloomery where its sign reads "Bloomery: On the Road to Everywhere." After Bloomery, WV 127 continues following Bloomery Run past many old stagecoach inns and farmhouses. At a gap in Bear Garden Mountain (1572 ft), WV 127 curves eastward through the community of Good, then straddles the border between Hampshire County and Frederick County, Virginia. WV 127 crosses the Virginia line and becomes VA 127 at the entrance of I.L. Pugh Road (CR 6/2).

History
The West Virginia portion of the Bloomery Pike, WV 29 from U.S. Route 50 near Pleasant Dale to WV 127 in Forks of Cacapon as well as WV 127 from WV 29 to the state line, was once designated West Virginia Route 45. This explains why all Hampshire County secondary routes off WV 29 and WV 127 have 45 as their numerator.

Major intersections

References

External links

127
West Virginia Route 127